Pardon C (born Obinna Okoro; November 15) is a United States-based Nigerian singer-songwriter and an entrepreneur currently signed to TCO Music.

Career 
In 2009 he released Ukwu Ruo Ala, since then he has released several Highlife singles that also includes international collaborations. The singer kept honing his skills to master his own act, he followed it up with another single Chain Dem, after a year, he dropped another single entitled Romeo in 2015.

As an artist representing his home country Nigeria in diaspora, the singer has graced the stage with music greats like 2face Idibia, Uganda's Jose Chameleone and singers like Flavour N'abania, Bracket, Olamide, Wizkid, Davido, Psquare and some others.

In 2016 the T.C.O Music recording artist, licensed all his musical works to theMedia 360 Company Limited, the company which helped him in distributing his musical works and in the same year he released yet another single Emergency after a brief hiatus, the song was aired on local radio stations in Nigeria, Internet Radio in UK and United States and talked about on online Entertainment Magazine's. After few months he followed it up with Gbabe.

The highlife singer left the scene in 2016 and returned in 2017 with an international collaboration Bele Bele, the song talks about the beauty of an African Woman and he featured Legendary Ugandan artiste, Jose Chameleone on it. The song has had it own controversy surrounding it despite having an A-List artist on the song, according to local media Naij the online news magazine reports that the Ugandan singer refused to show the usual supports as expected of him. Pardon C was also featured on Cameroonian singer-songwriter / rapper, Naomi Achu's new single Shower Your Blessings a pseudo "Queen of Bamenda."
 
Pardon C is the brand Ambassador of N'Square Boutique and the brother of Beauty Entrepreneur Thelma Okoro, ONYC Hair Founder. In 2017, the singer won the award for "Best Music Video" at the annual Next Generation Awards.

Singles 
 2009: "Ukwu Ruo Ala"
 2015: "Chain Dem" 
 2015: "Beauty Wahala" 
 2015: "Wereya Easy"
 2015: "Igbo Nwere Mmadu"
 2015: "Romeo"
 2016: "Emergency"
 2016: "Gbabe"
 2017: "Bele Bele" Feat. Jose Chameleone
 2017: "Eyes Don See"
 2018: "Mama"
 2018: "Brain Box"
 2019: "Fire Lady"
 2019: "ije love"
 2019: "One Africa"
 2019: "Gimme Body"
 2020: "Giver"
 2021: "Falling"
 2022: "Benzima"
 2023: "Gbona"

Awards and nominations

References

External links
 
Pardon C on Twitter
Pardon C on Facebook
Pardon C on YouTube
Pardon C on Instagram

Nigerian male pop singers
Living people
Musicians from Lagos
Musicians from Imo State
1987 births
21st-century Nigerian  male singers